Bannockburn is a rural township near Geelong, Victoria, Australia, 88 km southwest of Melbourne. It is located in Golden Plains Shire.

History

The township, originally named Leigh Road, was founded in the early 1850s. It is presumed to have been named after the 14th century battle site in Scotland, and grew as a coaching stop during the 1850s and 1860s, when the main route to the Ballarat goldfields was via the port of Geelong. The railway came to the town with the opening of the Geelong-Ballarat line in 1862. The local railway station was originally called Leigh Road but the name was changed to Bannockburn in 1904. Today, only grain and freight trains use the line.

The township grew around the station and a post office, called Leigh Road Railway Station, opened on 18 May 1863. It was renamed Leigh Road in 1873, Wabdallah in 1875, and finally Bannockburn in 1892.

Bannockburn township contains notable examples of Victorian colonial architecture, such as the former Somerset Hotel (1854), now a private home, and the Bannockburn Railway Station (1863). The former Bannockburn Lock Up  in  Victor Street (1860)  was relocated from Lethbridge to its present site in 1869.  In the 1940s, the lock up's adjoining  police station residence became a farmhouse  at a Hills Road property  in  Batesford. Both the railway station and former lock up are listed on the Victorian Heritage Register.

Governance

Bannockburn Road District (an early form of local government in Victoria) was established on 31 October 1862 and was redesignated as a shire on 30 June 1864. The shire absorbed Meredith Shire on 15 September 1915 and part of the shire's Steiglitz riding was transferred to Corio Shire on 31 May 1916.

On 18 May 1993 part of Bannockburn Shire was amalgamated with part of Barrabool Shire and with Bellarine Rural City, Corio Shire, Geelong City, Geelong West City, Newtown City & South Barwon City to form City of Greater Geelong local government area.

On 6 May 1994 the remainder of Bannockburn Shire, including Bannockburn itself, was amalgamated with part of Ballan Shire, part of Buninyong Shire, part of Grenville Shire and the whole of Leigh S to form Golden Plains Shire.

Present day

At the 2016 census, the population of Bannockburn was 5,283. Ten years prior, the population was 2486 residents. It is forecast to grow to 9,911 by 2036
With a growth rate of 1.3% per annum, Golden Plains Shire is the top ten fastest growing regional Local Government Area (LGA) in Victoria by percentage.

The nearby Bannockburn Vineyards is a 25-hectare vineyard on the Midland Highway, established in 1974 by Stuart Hooper. Grapes grown include cabernet sauvignon, chardonnay, malbec, merlot, pinot noir, riesling, sauvignon blanc and shiraz.

The Golden Plains Farmers Market occurs at Bannockburn on the first Saturday of every month. The market sells produce made by local business, wineries, jam makers, plants, baked produce, and meats and vegetables included. The market also feature local musicians such as 'The Johnson trio'.

The town has a public college as well as a private primary school. The college teaches grades Prep to Year 10 (as of 2020). Bannockburn is also home to a branch of the Geelong Regional Library Corporation, which replaced the once to twice a week visit by the Geelong Regional Mobile Library Service.

The central area is populated by a number of small businesses serving the majority of the locals needs including: Home hardware, Woolworths supermarket, Petrol stations, Bendigo Bank, Doctor's surgeries, Pathology, Dentist, Hairdressers, Take Away shops, Pizza shops, Gym, Mechanics, Newsagent, The Railway Hotel, Pub, Chemist and Optometrist. The following emergency services are also located in the town: Police, CFA, SES and Ambulance.

An extensive concrete bike trail is available for those that wish to use it located throughout the town. Near its starting point is a Lions Club founded park, with play equipment. There is also a skate park located near the football ground.

Local landmarks include a bridge, some old and distinctive Gum trees, and a local wind power generator. Bannockburn is unofficially divided by the railway line, with locals using it as a landmark to guide others to certain locations.

The Bannockburn Lagoon is used for fishing, and picnic activities. It is not recommended for swimming.

Council offices, and a Family Services Centre, are located on Pope Street.

Sport

Australian Rules
The town has an Australian Rules football team competing in the Geelong & District Football League known as the Tigers.

Lawn Bowls
Bannockburn and District Bowls Club is located in the town.

Cricket
The town has a cricket club called the Bannockburn Bulls.

Golf
Golfers play at the Bannockburn Golf Club on Teesdale Road.

Soccer
Bannockburn has a soccer team called Golden Plains Soccer Club, formed in 2012. They compete in the Victorian State League Division 5, which is the seventh level of soccer in Victoria and the eighth in Australia.

Other Sports
There are weeknight netball and basketball competitions available at the local indoor centre.

References

External links
 Bannockburn Railway Station

Towns in Victoria (Australia)
Golden Plains Shire
Wine regions of Victoria (Australia)